Treasure Master is a platform game released by ASC Games in 1991 for the Nintendo Entertainment System as part of a contest involving MTV.

Contest
After the game's release in late 1991, players had until 12PM EST on April 11, 1992, to practice beating the game. At this time, MTV revealed a secret password. By entering in this password and the game's serial number before beginning the game, players unlocked a secret sixth Prize World level. After this, players had until midnight to complete the entire game, including the Prize World. This prompted the game to reveal a 24-character code. By calling in to a special hotline with this code, players had a chance at winning one of 36,252 prizes.

Music
The game's music was composed by Tim Follin. The game's title screen music is a remix of the theme song to the Starsky & Hutch television series.

References

1991 video games
Nintendo Entertainment System games
Nintendo Entertainment System-only games
Platform games
Side-scrolling video games
Defunct esports competitions
Video games scored by Tim Follin
Video games developed in the United Kingdom
ASC Games games
Single-player video games